Luk or LUK may refer to:

Surname
Luk or Loke is the Cantonese romanization of several (but not all) Chinese surnames that are romanized as Lu in Mandarin. It may refer to:

Lu (surname 陆)
Lu (surname 禄)
Lu (surname 逯)
Lu (surname 鹿)

Other uses
Luk (band), a Ukrainian band
LuK, a Schaeffler Group brand
Cincinnati Municipal Lunken Airport, US, IATA airport code
Leucadia National, US company, NYSE symbol

See also
Luc (surname)